He Bin (Chinese: 何滨) (born June 26, 1983) is a Chinese former footballer who played as a midfielder.

Club career

Shanghai Shenhua
He Bin graduated from the Shanghai Shenhua youth team in 2004 after playing for their various youth teams that trained in Brazil. He would go on to make his league debut on October 2, 2004 when he came on as a substitute for Yu Tao against Sichuan Guancheng that ended 1-1. Despite being included in the senior team for two seasons he was unable to establish himself within the squad and only played in 12 league games.

Henan Jianye
Shanghai Shenhua allowed He Bin to transfer to second tier club Henan Jianye in 2006 where he would play his part in their promotion and league win. A squad regular throughout the 2007 Chinese Super League campaign it wasn't until the 2008 league season before he established himself as an integral member within the squad. This was followed by He Bin aiding Henan to their highest ever league ranking of third within the 2009 league season and entry to the 2010 AFC Champions League for the first time where he played on one game during the tournament against Gamba Osaka on April 27, 2010 in a 1-1 draw.
In February 2014, He Bin moved to China League One side Chengdu Tiancheng on a one-year loan deal.

He chose to retire at the end of the 2014 season due to injuries.

Honours
Henan Jianye
China League One: 2006, 2013

References

External links
Player profile at Henan Jianye website
Player stats at sohu.com

1983 births
Living people
Sportspeople from Luoyang
Chinese footballers
Footballers from Henan
Henan Songshan Longmen F.C. players
Shanghai Shenhua F.C. players
Chengdu Tiancheng F.C. players
Chinese Super League players
China League One players
Association football midfielders
21st-century Chinese people